The 1965 NCAA University Division Tennis Championships were the 20th annual tournaments to determine the national champions of NCAA University Division men's singles, doubles, and team collegiate tennis in the United States.

UCLA captured the team championship, the Bruins' eighth such title. UCLA finished eighteen points ahead of Miami (FL) in the final team standings (31–13).

Host site
This year's tournaments were contested at the University of California, Los Angeles in Los Angeles, California.

Team scoring
Until 1977, the men's team championship was determined by points awarded based on individual performances in the singles and doubles events.

References

External links
List of NCAA Men's Tennis Champions

NCAA Division I tennis championships
NCAA Division I Tennis Championships
NCAA Division I Tennis Championships
NCAA University Division Tennis Championships